The Arkhangel'skiy Nunataks are a group of scattered rock outcrops about  west of the central part of the Lazarev Mountains. They have been photographed by U.S. Navy Operation Highjump, 1946–47, the Soviet Antarctic Expedition, 1958, and an Australian National Antarctic Research Expedition, 1959. The largest of the outcrops had been named by the Soviet expedition after Soviet geologist Andrey Arkhangelsky; the broader application of the name to the entire group follows the recommendation by the Antarctic Names Committee of Australia.

References 

Nunataks of Oates Land